Amanda Baker (born December 22, 1979) is an American actress. She is best known for portraying Jolene Crowell on General Hospital: Night Shift in 2007 and Babe Carey Chandler on All My Children from 2007 to 2008. Baker reappeared on June 4 and 29, 2009 as a ghost on All My Children as Babe Chandler.

Biography 
Born as Laura Amanda Baker in Mount Pleasant, South Carolina and originally from Charleston, South Carolina, Baker received her degree in business marketing (with a minor in fashion merchandising) at the University of South Carolina before breaking into a television career. She is the daughter of D. F. Keels Baker and Laura Baker.

Career
Baker starred as Jolene Crowell  on General Hospital: Night Shift. She joined the cast of All My Children as the new Babe Carey Chandler on October 8, 2007. In an odd move, she debuted on the same day that actress Alexa Havins exited the role. When Babe hugged Krystal (the character's mother), it was Havins, but when the hug ceased, Amanda Baker was present. She departed from the role in October 2008. Baker reappeared on June 4 and 29, 2009 on All My Children as Babe's ghost.

Filmography
 (2004): One Tree Hill as Charlotte
 (2004): The Dead Will Tell as Girl in Marsh
 (2005): Palmetto Pointe as Callah O'Connell
 (2005): Locusts as Gina
 (2006): Hello Sister, Goodbye Life as Betsy
 (2006): The Other Side as Waitress
 (2006): Surface as Wardrobe Girl 
 (2007): Campus Ladies as Melanie 
 (2007): General Hospital: Night Shift as Jolene Crowell
 (2007–09): All My Children as Arbella "Babe" Carey – Chandler (October 8, 2007 – October 31, 2008, June 4 and 29, 2009)
 (2010): Rules of Engagement as Meghan
 (2014): V/H/S: Viral as Houdini Girl #2 (segment "Dante the Great")

References

External links
Official Amanda Baker Website

1979 births
Actresses from South Carolina
American television actresses
American soap opera actresses
Living people
People from Mount Pleasant, South Carolina
21st-century American actresses